Darrien Doherty (born ) is an Australian former rugby league footballer who played in the 1990s. He is one of three players to date (the others being Tyran Smith and Blake Green) to play first grade for a record seven different NRL clubs.

Career

Doherty didn't play again in first grade until 1993 when he joined Wests. Staying at the club for two seasons, Doherty played a total four games and scored his first top grade points with a try in the club's 38-4 win over the Gold Coast Seagulls in round 14 of the 1994 season.

In 1995, Doherty joined the Sydney Bulldogs and started the season in first grade against North Queensland as a replacement forward. Doherty then became a regular member of the reserve grade team.

In 1996, Doherty joined the Illawarra Steelers to play 20 games that season.

In 1997, Doherty joined the Hunter Mariners to play 11 games that season and in 1998, joined the Adelaide Rams to play 19 games that season.

In 1999, Doherty joined North Queensland Cowboys to play eight games from 1999 to 2000.

References

External links
Bulldogs profile

1971 births
Living people
Adelaide Rams players
Australian rugby league players
Canterbury-Bankstown Bulldogs players
Hunter Mariners players
Illawarra Steelers players
North Queensland Cowboys players
Penrith Panthers players
Western Suburbs Magpies players
Rugby league players from New South Wales
Rugby league props
Rugby league second-rows